The devil's grandmother appears in the German fairy tales The Devil and his Grandmother and The Devil with the Three Golden Hairs. She appears in the Swedish film, Haxan, in the sabbath scene, where she concocts spells. Her appearance is similar to the traditional depiction of demons, but is covered in fur. 

In some lore, the witch Baba Yaga is stated to be the devil's grandmother.

Also occasionally mentioned in less prominent roles are the devil's other relatives, such as his mother.

References

External links
 The Devil and His Grandmother 

Russian folklore
Female characters in fairy tales
The Devil in fairy tales
Fictional families
Idioms